Peter Woodthorpe (25 September 1931 – 13 August 2004) was an English actor who supplied the voice of Gollum in the 1978 Bakshi version of The Lord of the Rings and BBC's 1981 radio serial. He also provided the voice of Pigsy in the cult series Monkey and was Max the pathologist in early episodes of Inspector Morse.

In 1955, he portrayed Estragon in the first British production of Waiting for Godot. He had then just finished his second year reading Biochemistry at Magdalene College, Cambridge, and expected to return after a run of a few weeks. When the play was successful, faced with the choice of dropping out either from Cambridge or from the play, he chose to stay with the play and his acting career. In 1960, he played Aston in the first production of Harold Pinter's The Caretaker at the Arts Theatre, in London, prior to transferring to the West End's Duchess Theatre on 30 May 1960. He also starred as Oxford in the Broadway musical Darling of the Day.

Before going up to Cambridge he was educated at Archbishop Holgate's Grammar School and served as a national serviceman in the Royal Navy, training at the Joint Services School for Linguists as a Russian interpreter.

In 1964 and 1965, he made three films for cinematographer-turned-director Freddie Francis: The Evil of Frankenstein (1964), Hysteria (1965) and The Skull (1965), the first two for Hammer Films and the last for Amicus Productions. His characters in these films were all sleazy, corrupt and manipulative types (a hypnotist, a nudie photographer and a corrupt landlord).

Other television appearances include as the writer Honoré de Balzac in the BBC series Notorious Woman (1974) and as the corrupt Councillor Webb in the hard-hitting police drama The Professionals; episode Not a Very Civil Civil Servant (1978).

One of Woodthorpe's best-remembered roles was the guest role of Reg Trotter, father of Del Boy, in the 1983 Christmas special Thicker than Water, an episode of the BBC sitcom Only Fools and Horses. In 1984, he and Lennard Pearce (who starred on the programme as Grandad Trotter, Reg's father, and appeared alongside him in that episode) were seen together again in the Minder episode The Balance of Power.

Since 1994, he recorded the voices of Toad, Great White Stag and Whistler in a BBC Young Collection audiotape version of the Animals of Farthing Wood. He died at the age of 72 on 13 August 2004 in Banbury, Oxfordshire following a short illness.

Partial filmography

 Father Came Too! (1963) – Farmer
 The Evil of Frankenstein (1964) – Zoltan
 Hysteria (1965) – Marcus Allan
 The Skull (1965) – Travers
 The Blue Max (1966) – Corporal Rupp
 The Charge of the Light Brigade (1968) – Cardigan's Valet
 Sam and the River (1975) – Smithy
 Lord of the Rings (1978) – Gollum / Smeagol (voice)
 The Mirror Crack'd (1980) – Scout Master
 To Catch a King (1984) – Elric Becker
 A Christmas Carol (1984) – Old Joe
 Eleni (1985) – Grandfather
 Inspector Morse (1987–1988, TV Series) – Dr. Max DeBryn 
 Testimony (1988) – Alexander Glazunov
 Massacre Play (1989) – Straccalino
 Red Hot (1993) – Professor Lusis
 The Madness of King George (1994) – Clergyman
 The Animals of Farthing Wood (1994) Toad, The Great White Stag, Whistler (Audiotape only)
 England, My England (1995) – Kiffen
 Jane Eyre (1996) – Briggs
 The Odyssey (1997) – Mentor
 Merlin (1998) – Soothsayer
 The Strange Case of Delphina Potocka or The Mystery of Chopin (1999) – 3rd Official

References

External links
 
 
 Obituary in The Guardian
 Obituary in The New York Times

1931 births
2004 deaths
Alumni of Magdalene College, Cambridge
English male film actors
English male stage actors
English male television actors
English male voice actors
Male actors from York
People educated at Archbishop Holgate's School
Royal Navy sailors